Barkai is an Israeli kibbutz in the Menashe Regional Council on the western side of Wadi Ara.

History
Kibbutz Barkai was founded on 10 May 1949 on land that had belonged to the depopulated Palestinian village of Wadi Ara.

Economic branches include  thermal and acoustic insulation, lamination and packaging: the Polyon Barkai factory; and agriculture: cattle, poultry, avocado and field crops.

Infimer Technologies manufactures a recycled composite polymer that serves as raw material for plastic manufacturers. Combined with virgin plastic, it is used to make chairs, tables, crates, plumbing pipes and toolboxes.

Panorama

References

External links
Official website 
Polyon

Kibbutzim
Kibbutz Movement
Menashe Regional Council
Populated places established in 1949
Populated places in Haifa District
1949 establishments in Israel
Polish-Jewish culture in Israel
Romanian-Jewish culture in Israel